Karachi Division is an administrative division of the Sindh Province of Pakistan. There are seven districts of Karachi.

History 
In December 1960 Lasbela became a separate district from Kalat division and was placed to form Karachi-Bela division.

In 1972, Lasbela district transferred back to Kalat division and Karachi district divided into three (03) districts; East, West and South.

In 1996, Two (02) more districts Central and Malir was created in Karachi division.

The Karachi Division was abolished in 2001 and five districts of Karachi were merged in City District Karachi. The City District Karachi was divided in 18 Towns and 178 union councils. Commissioner Karachi division was made DCO City District government Karachi.

On 11 July 2011, Sindh Government restored 5 districts of Karachi division.

In November 2013, a new district (sixth), Korangi was formed by splitting District Karachi East.

In August 2020, Sindh cabinet approved formation of the seventh district in Karachi - Keamari District. Keamari District was formed by splitting District West.

Currently, Sindh government is planning to create Bin Qasim district after bifurcating Malir district.

Districts of Karachi Division 

There are seven districts of Karachi, namely:
 Karachi Central District
 Karachi East District
 Karachi South District
 Karachi West District
 Korangi District
 Malir District
 Keamari District

References

Division
Divisions of Sindh
Urdu-speaking countries and territories